Samou Seidou Adambi is a Beninese politician. He is the former mayor of the commune and city of Parakou.

See also
Politics of Benin

References

Year of birth missing (living people)
Place of birth missing (living people)
Living people
Mayors of places in Benin
People from Parakou